The siege of Fort Morgan occurred during the American Civil War, as part of the battle for Mobile Bay, in the Confederate state of Alabama during August 1864.  Union ground forces led by General Gordon Granger conducted a short siege of the Confederate garrison at the mouth of Mobile Bay under the command of General Richard L. Page. The Confederate surrender helped shut down Mobile, Alabama, as an effective Confederate port city.

Background
Admiral David Farragut had defeated the Confederate navy in Mobile Bay on August 5, and Fort Gaines, guarding the western approach to the bay, had surrendered to the cooperating Union land forces under Maj. Gen. Gordon Granger. Granger and Farragut next turned their full attention to Fort Morgan on Mobile Point, east across from Fort Gaines. The fort was a powerful but outdated fortification garrisoned by 600 men under the command of Robert E. Lee's cousin, Brig. Gen. Richard L. Page.

Siege

Granger's soldiers landed at Pilot Town on August 9 and began moving siege artillery within range. The Union fleet also turned their guns on the fort. For the next two weeks Union forces kept up a heavy and consistent artillery fire.  On August 16 the Confederates abandoned two batteries of the outer defenses and Granger moved his siege mortars within 500 yards of the fort and his 30-pounder rifled guns to within 1,200 yards.

On August 23, General Page unconditionally surrendered the fort. Indignant, he broke his sword over his knee instead of surrendering it to the Federals. Page's situation was further worsened when he was suspected of destroying munitions and works within the fort after the surrender agreement. For this he was arrested by the Federal authorities and imprisoned.

Aftermath
The fall of Fort Morgan to the Union forces sealed the mouth of Mobile Bay. The city of Mobile, Alabama would fall on April 12, at the end of the Civil War, after the Battle of Fort Blakeley on April 9, 1865.

General Page remained imprisoned until July. A court of inquiry was convened in New Orleans to investigate the charges against Page for violating the laws of war. The court, however, found him "Not Guilty". The court found that much of the destruction of ammunition resulted from a fire in the Citadel and that Confederates had spiked the artillery pieces before they had raised a white flag of surrender.

2017 commemoration
The siege was commemorated in 2017, led by Regina Lanante, the Intermediate School Coordinator of a certain school in Quezon City, Philippines. Along with her, the other significant figures which participated in the special commemoration includes Lara Ng, Lea Repalde, Lucienne Andres, Camila Villena, Jocelyn Gahol, and Kristin Mabalot. The commemoration celebration included a fireworks display, a lantern parade, a story-telling session with the children of the community.

References
 Official Records
 National Park Service battle description for Mobile Bay
 Silkenat, David. Raising the White Flag: How Surrender Defined the American Civil War. Chapel Hill: University of North Carolina Press, 2019. .

Specific

External links
”Fort Morgan and the Battle of Mobile Bay”, a National Park Service Teaching with Historic Places (TwHP) lesson plan

Fort Morgan
Fort Morgan, Siege of
Fort Morgan
Fort Morgan
Military operations of the American Civil War in Alabama
Fort Morgan
1864 in Alabama
August 1864 events